Rudolph Glossop (17 February 1902 – 1 March 1993) was a British mining and civil engineer and one of the founders of Geotechnical Engineering in the UK.
The Glossop Lecture at the Geological Society is named after him.

References

External links
Geological Society Glossop Lecture

1902 births
1993 deaths
Geotechnical engineers
Rankine Lecturers